Carlow is the county town of County Carlow, in the south-east of Ireland,  from Dublin. At the 2016 census, it had a combined urban and rural population of 24,272.

The River Barrow flows through the town and forms the historic boundary between counties Laois and Carlow. However, the Local Government (Ireland) Act 1898 included the town entirely in County Carlow. The settlement of Carlow is thousands of years old and pre-dates written Irish history. The town has played a major role in Irish history, serving as the capital of the country in the 14th century.

Etymology
The name is an anglicisation of the Irish Ceatharlach. Historically, it was anglicised as Caherlagh, Caterlagh and Catherlagh, which are closer to the Irish spelling. According to logainm.ie, the first part of the name derives from the Old Irish word cethrae ("animals, cattle, herds, flocks"), which is related to ceathar ("four") and therefore signified "four-legged". The second part of the name is the ending -lach.

Some believe that the name should be Ceatharloch (meaning "quadruple lake"), since ceathar means "four" and loch means "lake". It is directly translated as "Four lakes", although, there is seemingly no evidence to suggest that these lakes ever existed in this area.

History

Evidence shows that human occupation in the Carlow county area extends back thousands of years. The most notable and dramatic prehistoric site is the Browneshill Dolmen – a megalithic portal tomb just outside Carlow town.

Now part of the diocese of Kildare and Leighlin, several Early Christian settlements are still in evidence today around the county. St Mullin's monastery is believed to have been established around the 7th century, the ruins of which are still in evidence today. Old Leighlin was the site of one of the largest monastic settlements in Ireland and the location for a church synod in 630 AD which determined the date of Easter. St Comhgall built a monastery in the Carlow area in the 6th century, an old church building and burial ground survive today at Castle Hill known as Mary's Abbey. Carlow was an Irish stronghold for agriculture in the early 1800s which earned the county the nickname of the scallion eaters. Famine later wiped out half of the population.

Carlow Castle was constructed by William Marshal, Earl of Striguil and Lord of Leinster, to guard the vital river crossing. It was also to serve as the capital of the Lordship of Ireland from 1361 until 1374. This imposing structure survived largely intact until 1814 when it was mostly destroyed in an attempt to turn the building into a lunatic asylum. The present remains now are the West Wall with two of its cylindrical towers.

Carlow was incorporated as a borough in 1296 by Edward I. The parliamentary borough returned two MPs to the Irish House of Commons until 1801 and its successor constituency returned one MP to the United Kingdom House of Commons from 1801 to 1885.

The bridge over the River Barrow, Graiguecullen Bridge, is agreed to date to 1569. The original structure was largely replaced and widened in 1815 when it was named Wellington Bridge in celebration of the defeat of Napoleon's army by the Duke of Wellington at the Battle of Waterloo in June of that year. The bridge was built across a small island in the river and a 19th-century house was constructed on the bridge – this was for a time occupied by the Poor Clares, an enclosed religious order who still have a convent in Graiguecullen.

Another convent belonging to the Presentation Order of nuns now houses the County Library and the Carlow County Museum. The cathedral, designed by Thomas Cobden, was the first Catholic cathedral to be built in Ireland after Catholic Emancipation in 1829. Its construction cost £9,000 and was completed in 1833.

Saint Patrick's College, located beside the cathedral, dates from 1793. The college was established in 1782 to teach the humanities to both lay students and those studying for the priesthood. The Carlow Courthouse was constructed in the 19th century. There are still many old estates and houses in the surrounding areas, among them Ducketts Grove and Dunleckney Manor. St Mullin's today houses a heritage centre.

In 1703 the Irish House of Commons appointed a committee to bring in a bill to make the River Barrow navigable; by 1800 the River Barrow Track was completed between St. Mullin's and Athy, establishing a link to the Grand Canal which runs between Dublin and the Shannon. By 1845 88,000 tons of goods were being transported on the River Barrow Navigation. Carlow was also one of the earliest towns to be connected by train.

The Great Southern and Western Railway had opened its mainline as far as Carlow in 1846, and this was extended further to Cork in 1849. The chief engineer, William Dargan, originally hailed from Killeshin, just outside Carlow. At the peak of rail transport in Ireland, Carlow county was also served by a line to Tullow.

Public supply of electricity in Carlow was first provided from Milford Mills, approximately 8 km south of Carlow, in 1891. Milford Mills still generates electricity feeding into the national grid. Following independence in the early 1920s, the new government of the Irish Free State decided to establish a sugar-processing plant in Leinster. Carlow was chosen as the location due to its transport links and large agricultural hinterland, favourable for growing sugar beet.

The town is recalled in the famous Irish folk song, Follow Me Up to Carlow, written in the 19th century about the Battle of Glenmalure, part of the Desmond Rebellions of the late 16th century. In 1650, during the Cromwellian conquest of Ireland, Carlow was besieged and taken by English Parliamentarian forces, hastening the end of the Siege of Waterford and the capitulation of that city.

During the 1798 rebellion Carlow was the scene of a massacre of 600 rebels and civilians following an unsuccessful attack on the town by the United Irishmen, known as the Battle of Carlow. The Liberty Tree sculpture in Carlow, designed by John Behan, commemorates the events of 1798. The rebels slain in Carlow town are buried in the 'Croppies Grave', in '98 Street, Graiguecullen.

Irish language
Until the early-19th century Irish was spoken in all twelve counties of the province of Leinster, of which County Carlow forms part. According to Celtic scholar Nicholas Williams, the Irish spoken in County Carlow seems to have belonged to a central dialect stretching from west Connacht eastwards to the Liffey estuary. It had characteristics which survive today only in Connacht Irish.

It preserved the stress pattern of Old Irish in which the first syllable of a word receives strong stress. Evidence from place names suggests that Old Irish cn- had become "cr-" in parts of Carlow, like all Gaelic speech outside of Munster and Ossory. An example from Carlow is "Crukeen". West Carlow seems to have pronounced "slender R" as "slender Z" (like the "s" in "treasure" or "pleasure") which is also a well-attested feature of the (now extinct) traditional dialects of Kilkenny and South Laois.

Efforts are now being made to increase the use of Irish in Carlow under the aegis of the organisation Glór Cheatharlach. Carlow has two schools which teach through Irish: a Gaelscoil (primary) founded in 1982 and a Gaelcholáiste (secondary) founded in 1990. Both schools are at full capacity and supplemented by an Irish-speaking pre-school or Naíonra. There is also an intensive Irish-language summer course for students from English-speaking schools. It has been claimed by Bride de Roiste of Glór Cheatharlach that there is more Irish spoken in Carlow than in certain Gaeltacht districts.

Media
The Nationalist is a newspaper which was established in 1883. The Carlow People is a free weekly newspaper

Places of interest
One of Carlow's most notable landmarks is the Brownshill Dolmen, situated on the Hacketstown Road (R726) approximately 5 km from Carlow town centre. The capstone of this dolmen is reputed to be the largest in Europe.

Milford is a green area on the River Barrow approx 5 miles outside of Carlow town. It is notable as its home to Milford Mill, which was the first inland hydro-electrical plant in Ireland. It began supplying Carlow town with power in 1891.

Economy
Carlow industry has come a long way since the early 20th century when the town became the centre of Ireland's slow process of industrialisation with the creation of the Irish Sugar Company. Then at the cutting edge of industry in Ireland, the sugar factory opened in 1926 as a private enterprise and was eventually nationalised before reverting to private ownership. It closed on 11 March 2005 as the management of the parent company Greencore decided that it was no longer economical to run the factory nor was it viable to upgrade the facility. The country's last remaining sugar plant at Mallow, County Cork closed in 2006.

One of the traditional, principal employers in Carlow was OralB Braun, which had a large factory producing mostly hairdryers and electric toothbrushes; however, this closed in 2010. Burnside is also a large employer in the area; it produces hydraulic cylinders. The South East Technological University is also a significant employer in the town. Since opening its doors in October 2003 Fairgreen Shopping Centre has also played a large part in employment in the area; Tesco, Heatons, Next, New Look and River Island are the main tenants. Nonetheless, the town shares problems associated with other provincial towns in Ireland – the inability to attract significant new industry. Pharmaceutical giant Merck & Co. intends to build a new vaccine manufacturing plant in Carlow.

Transport
The N9 road from Dublin to Waterford passed directly through the town until May 2008 when a bypass, part of the M9 motorway, was opened, greatly reducing traffic through the town. The N80 National secondary road skirts the edge of the town. The town is also connected to the national rail network. These transport links have helped Carlow to become a successful satellite town of Dublin in recent years.

The establishment of the Institute of Technology, Carlow, has also helped drive growth in the area and encouraged many school leavers to remain in the town. Carlow railway station opened on 4 August 1846 and was closed for goods traffic on 9 June 1976, it remains open for public travel.

Education

Secondary schools serving the area include Gaelcholáiste Cheatharlach, Presentation College, Tyndall College (including the former Carlow Vocational School), Tullow Community School, St Leo's College, and St Mary's Knockbeg College. There is also the post-leaving certificate Carlow Institute of Further Education.

Third-level institutions include the South East Technological University, formerly the Institute of Technology, Carlow, and Carlow College.

Religion

Carlow Cathedral dedicated to Our Lady of Assumption, was started in 1828 and completed in 1833, in Gothic style. A sculpture by John Hogan is a memorial to the bishop and was finished in 1839. An unidentified baby was left here on 22 January 2010.

Sport

Motor racing

On 2 July 1903, the Gordon Bennett Cup ran through Carlow. It was the first international motor race to be held in Great Britain or Ireland. The Automobile Club of Great Britain and Ireland wanted the race to be hosted in the British Isles, Ireland was suggested as the venue because racing was illegal on British public roads. After some lobbying and changes to local laws, Kildare was chosen, partly because the straightness of its roads would be a safety benefit. As a compliment to Ireland, the British team chose to race in Shamrock green which thus became known as British racing green. The route consisted of several laps of a circuit passed-through Kilcullen, Kildare, Monasterevin, Stradbally, Athy, Castledermot and Carlow. The   race was won by the Belgian racer Camille Jenatzy, driving a Mercedes.

Racquetball
The Carlow Racquetball club was set up in 1978. The club is one of only 7 in the southeastern region and is the largest of these.

Clubs
GAA clubs in the area include Tinryland GAA Club, Éire Óg GAA Club, Asca GAA Club, Palatine GAA club, and O'Hanrahans GAA Club.

County Carlow Football Club is the local rugby union club, while F.C. Carlow is a local association football club.

Carlow also has boxing clubs, an athletics club (St Laurence O'Toole Athletics Club), a golf club, a rowing club, a tennis club, a hockey club and the Carlow Jaguar Scooter Club. (Founded in 1979, this latter club is one of the longest-running scooter clubs in Ireland or England).

Climate
Carlow is in a maritime temperate oceanic region according to Köppen climate classification. It experiences cool winters, mild humid summers, and a lack of temperature extremes. Humidity is high year-round and rainfall is evenly distributed throughout the year.

People

 Sir John Bere (died  1617) – Crown official, Burgess of Carlow and MP for Carlow Borough 1613-15 
 John Brettan – Baron of the Court of Exchequer
 John Tyndall (1820–1893) – physicist
 John Lyons (1824–1867) – recipient of the Victoria Cross
 Arthur MacMurrough Kavanagh (1831–1889) – politician
 John Augustine Sheppard (1849–1925) – Monsignor, Vicar general of the Roman Catholic Archdiocese of Newark
 Eoghan Ó Tuairisc (1919–1982) – composer of Irish poetry in the Irish-language. Born at Ballinasloe, County Galway, but lived his later years at Carlow with his second wife.
 Kathryn Thomas (b. 1979) – television presenter for RTÉ
 Seán O'Brien (b. 1987) – Irish international rugby player
 John Gibbons – record producer, DJ
 Pádraig Amond (b. 1988) – Irish professional footballer who plays for Newport County
 Saoirse Ronan (b. 1994) – actress, born in America

Twin towns

Carlow is twinned with the following places:
  Davenport, Iowa, United States
  Tempe, Arizona, United States
  Dole, Jura, France
  Northwich, Cheshire, England

See also
List of towns and villages in Ireland
High Sheriff of Carlow
Lyster – English occupational surname, mentioned in histories as transplanted to Carlow in Ireland

Notes

References

External links

Carlow County Council

 
County towns in the Republic of Ireland
Towns and villages in County Carlow